Pranati Nayak (born 6 April 1995) is an Indian artistic gymnast. She is the 2019 Asian Championships vault bronze medalist. She is the third Indian gymnast to win an international medal on the vault, after Dipa Karmakar and Aruna Reddy. She represented India at the 2020 Summer Olympics and is only the second Indian female gymnast to qualify for the Olympic Games. She is also the 2019 Indian all-around champion. She represented India at the 2014 Commonwealth Games and at the 2018 Commonwealth Games and at the 2014 and 2018 Asian Games. She also competed at the 2014, 2017, and 2019 World Championships.

Early and personal life 
Nayak was born on 6 April 1995 in Jhargram. Her father worked as a state transport bus driver in West Bengal until 2017 when he took an office job, and her mother is a housewife. She began gymnastics when she was six years old. She moved to Kolkata to train in 2003, and her coach Minara Begum paid for her living expenses. She speaks Bengali, English, and Hindi.

Career 
Nayak's first major international competition was the 2014 Commonwealth Games. She competed in the team competition with Aruna Reddy, Pranati Das, Rucha Divekar, and Dipa Karmakar, and they placed eleventh. The same team in addition to Payel Bhattacharjee represented India at the 2014 Asian Games and placed eighth in the team event. Individually, Nayak qualified for the all-around final and finished twentieth with a total score of 43.800. The same Indian team competed again at the 2014 World Championships and finished last out of the thirty-eight teams.

Nayak competed at the 2017 Asian Championships where she finished fourteenth in the all-around. She qualified for the vault event final and finished fourth and the balance beam event final and finished fifth. She then competed at the 2017 World Championships and finished sixty-eighth in the all-around during the qualification round.

Nayak qualified for the vault final at the 2018 Melbourne World Cup and finished sixth. She then represented India at the 2018 Commonwealth Games alongside Aruna Reddy and Pranati Das where they finished seventh in the team competition. Individually, Nayak qualified for the vault event final where she finished eighth. Nayak, Reddy, and Das were joined by Mandira Chowdhury and Dipa Karmakar at the 2018 Asian Games where they placed seventh in the team final. Nayak qualified for the vault final and placed eighth.

Nayak won the gold medal in the all-around at the 2019 Indian Championships. At the 2019 Asian Championships, she finished thirteenth in the all-around. She won the bronze medal on the vault with an average score of 13.384. She was the third Indian gymnast to win a vault medal in a major international competition after Dipa Karmakar at the 2014 Commonwealth Games and Aruna Reddy at the 2018 Melbourne World Cup. At the 2019 World Championships, Nayak missed the all-around placement cutoff for the 2020 Olympic Games by less than three points. 

Nayak earned a continental quota spot to the 2020 Summer Olympics alongside Sri Lanka’s Milka Gehani after the cancellation of the 2021 Asian Championships. She was only the second female gymnast to represent India at the Olympics, after Dipa Karmakar. She was only able to train for two months prior to the Olympics due her gym being closed for a year during the COVID-19 pandemic in India. At the Olympics, she finished seventy-ninth in the all-around with a total score of 42.565 during the qualification round. She did not qualify for any of the finals.

Competitive history

See also 
 Gymnastics in India

References

External links
 
 

1995 births
Living people
People from Jhargram district
Sportswomen from West Bengal
Indian female artistic gymnasts
Olympic gymnasts of India
Gymnasts at the 2020 Summer Olympics
Asian Games competitors for India
Gymnasts at the 2014 Asian Games
Gymnasts at the 2018 Asian Games
Gymnasts at the 2014 Commonwealth Games
Gymnasts at the 2018 Commonwealth Games
Gymnasts at the 2022 Commonwealth Games
Commonwealth Games competitors for India